Urueña is a municipality located in the province of Valladolid, Castile and León, Spain. According to the 2004 census (INE), the municipality has a population of 213 inhabitants.

The streets and stone houses have been restored to those of a medieval town. It still retains much of the city walls with two gates and the castle. The parish church, Santa María del Azogue , was built in gothic-renaissance styles.

It also has four museums. Outside the walled enclosure and within walking distance is the Romanesque-style Ermita de Nuestra Señora de la Anunciada (Hermitage of Our Lady of the Annunciation) and the ruins of an old monastery. Evidence of prehistoric inhabitants have been found in the region.

It is member of the I.O.B.-International Organisation of Book Towns, a network of villages in which second-hand and antiquarian bookshops are concentrated.

Gallery

See also
Cuisine of the province of Valladolid

References

Municipalities in the Province of Valladolid